Azerbaijani folk music (Azerbaijani: Azərbaycan Xalq Musiqisi) combines the distinct cultural values of all civilisations that have lived in Azerbaijan and Iranian Azerbaijan region.

Apart from the common music found all-around Azerbaijan, there are distinct types of folk music, sometimes related to the history or simply the taste of the specific places.

History
Most songs recount stories of real-life events and Azerbaijani folklore, or have developed through song contests between troubadour poets. Corresponding to their origins, folk songs are usually played at weddings, funerals, and special festivals.

Regional folk music generally accompanies folk dances, which vary significantly across regions. The regional mood also affects the subject of the folk songs, e.g. folk songs from the Caspian Sea are lively in general and express the customs of the region. Songs about betrayal have an air of defiance about them instead of sadness, whereas the further south traveled in Azerbaijan the more the melodies resemble a lament.

As this genre is viewed as the music of the people, musicians in socialist movements began to adapt folk music with contemporary sounds and arrangements in the form of protest music.

The process of fusion among American musical styles and Azerbaijani folk can also be seen as the origin of Azerbaijani pop music, which attempted to elevate folk music through greater musicianship, or compositional and arrangement skills.

Traditional instruments

Stringed instruments
Plucked stringed instruments include the lute-like saz, chang, gopuz, tar and oud, originally barbat, and the dulcimer-like qanún (also sometimes hammered). Bowed stringed instruments include the kamancha.

Wind instruments

Woodwind instruments include the double-reed, shawm-like tutek (whistle flute), zurna, ney and balaban.

Percussion instruments
Percussion instruments include  the frame drum ghaval, the cylindrical double faced drum nagara (davul), and the gosha nagara (pair of small kettle drums) and daf (frame drum).

Apart from percussion instruments, there is also this musical gemstone known as Gaval Dash. It makes a tambourine-like sound when it is hit at different points. Among the stone books there are a big flat stone formed out of 3 supports. Suffice it to touch the object with a small stone, musical sounds come from it. The Gaval Dash has been formed due to the combination of unique climate, oil, and gas which can be found in the region of Azerbaijan. The Gaval Dash can only be found in Gobustan, Azerbaijan.

Forms of folk music

The earliest vernacular children's songs in Europe are lullabies from the later medieval period. From soon after we have records of short children's rhyming songs, but most nursery rhymes were not written down until the 18th century. The first, and possibly the most important collection to focus in this area was, Asaf Zeynally's children's suite and Ganbar Huseynli's Jujalarim. Children's songs, unlike folk songs, have remained part of a living and continuous tradition, for although added to from other sources and affected by written versions, most adults pass on songs they learned from oral sources as children.

War songs

In Azerbaijan songs about military and naval subjects were a major part of the output of ballad writers from the 18th century onwards, including one of the earliest Azerbaijani ballads ‘The Black Sea was storming’, which deals with the events of the Battle of Sarikamish in 1914. The conflicts between Azerbaijan and Armenia in the later 20th and early 19th centuries produced a number of ballads describing events, particularly conflicts like those of the Battle of Aghdam. Output became a flood during the Revolutionary and first Nagorno-Karabakh War, seeing numerous patriotic war songs, like "Cənab Leytenant" (Mister Lieutenant).

Work songs

Work songs include music sung while conducting a task (often to coordinate timing) or a song linked to a task or trade which might be a connected narrative, description, or protest song. The two main types of work song in Azerbaijani are agricultural work songs, usually are rhythmic a cappella songs sung by people working on a physical and often repetitive task, like the 'Tea song' common in Soviet Azerbaijan. The songs were probably intended to increase productivity while reducing feelings of boredom.

Regional traditions

Karabakh region 
Karabakh has been one of the key areas of Azerbaijani folk music and collection. It had retained a strong tradition of mugham and such as Şuşanın dağları başı dumanlı and Sari Gelin became vital part of music revival in Azerbaijan.

Baku region 
Despite being the centre of both folk revivals and the jazzy folk movement, the songs of Baku were largely neglected in favour of regional and rural music until relatively recently. Baku, unsurprisingly, was the most common location mentioned in Azerbaijani folk songs, including ‘Bakı Haqqında Mahnı’ (Song about Baku), and the ‘Bakı, Sabahın Xeyr’ (Good Morning Baku) and it was the centre of the broadside publishing industry.

Notable Performers

Individuals

Female
 Shovkat Alakbarova
 Sevda Alakbarzadeh
 Azerin
 Nazakat Mammadova
 Zeynab Khanlarova
 Aygün Kazımova
 Googoosh

Male
 Ogtay Aghayev
 Rashid Behbudov
 Bulbul
 Akif Islamzade
 Islam Rzayev
 Gulagha Mammadov

Musicians

 Habil Aliyev
 Ramiz Guliyev
 Avtandil Israfilov
 Elchin Hashimov
 Kamil Jalilov
 Bahram Mansurov
 Gurban Pirimov
 Rəmiş
 Sadigjan
 Alihan Samedov
 Natig Shirinov

See also 
 Sari Gelin
 Mugham
 Azerbaijani pop music

References

 
Azerbaijani
folk